Ruby Miller may refer to:

Ruby Miller (actress) (1889–1976), British actress
Ruby Miller (cyclist) (born 1992), Welsh racing cyclist